Shikkar is a 2010 Indian Malayalam-language mystery-thriller film directed by M. Padmakumar and written by S. Suresh Babu which was produced by Sreeraj Cinema. The film stars Mohanlal in lead role along with Kalabhavan Mani, Samuthirakani, Lalu Alex, Sneha, Ananya, Mythili, Kailash, Jagathy Sreekumar and Suraj Venjaramood in supporting roles. M. Jayachandran composed the music for the lyrics of Gireesh Puthenchery. The art direction was done by Manu Jagadh.

Shikkar was a Ramzan release on 11 September 2010, it received mixed reviews from the critics, and garnered critical praise for cinematography and Mohanlal's performance. It was one of the ten highest-grossing Malayalam films of 2010. The film received the Kerala Film Critics Award for Best Popular Film.

Plot

The story takes place at Chittazha, a mountainous terrain in Idukki where Bamboo Reeds flourish. After much wandering from place to place, Balraman, a lorry driver who lost his wife Kaveri, has finally settled down with his daughter Ganga at Chittazha. Peace evades him as his past catches up with him, and Balaraman has to take risky methods to safeguard his own life and that of his daughter's.

Balaraman's past of him being a police officer of the Andhra Pradesh Police Department was a secret to many. A group of Naxal's are behind him to kill his daughter and also Balaraman to avenge the death of their leader Abdullah who was killed in a fake encounter by the police a few years ago.

Cast

Production

Filming
The film was mainly shot at various locations in Pooyamkutty, Kothamangalam, also in Telangana (Andhra Pradesh) and Kodaikanal, Tamil Nadu. The climax scenes were shot in Guna caves and the hills in Kodaikanal, including a place termed as "Devil's kitchen". The filming completed in August 2010.

Reception

Box office
The film was a commercial success despite receiving mixed reviews from critics. Shikkar released on September 9 in Kerala, Chennai and Bangalore made an extraordinary opening in 110 screens. It grossed  in 8 days from 110 screens, which was phenomenal for a Malayalam film at that time. It was found at the number one position at the Kerala box-office among the Ramzan releases. The New Indian Express called it an "ultimate winner". Shikkar was found at the second place in the third week.

Critics review
Shibu B. S of The New Indian Express praised the cinematography of Manoj Pillai and Mohanlal's performance. He commented "The story is as old as the history of revenge sagas. However, scriptwriter has done a commendable job compared with his earlier scripts like Thaandavam, and has tried to inject oodles of energy". Paresh C. Palicha of Rediff.com rated 2/5 stars and said "Suresh Babu's script seems to be heavily inspired by two recent, much-discussed films; Madhupal's Thalappavu and Blessy's Bhramaram. The subject of Naxalism seems borrowed from the former while the edgy-eerie feel has been taken from the latter." and concluded as "Young Padmakumar tried to make Shikkar a mass-entertainer as well as a film with artistic merit; unfortunately, it falls somewhere in between". He appreciated the camera works of Manoj Pillai. Veeyen of Nowrunning.com awarded 2/5 stars and said "There are no directorial flourishes visible in Padmakumar's Shikkar that is old wine in an older bottle. As much as it remains a visual delight, the mysteries that it offers do not much thrill, and the story that it tells seldom excites". he highly praised the cinematography saying, "The real hero of the film is none other than cinematographer Manoj Pillai, the camerawork of the film seems like an adventure in itself".

Sify.com gave the verdict "very good" and said, "This film is far from being perfect especially in its first half, but it has been packaged quite well. With some superb performances, brilliant visuals, reasonably engaging script and nice music", he gave special mention to Manoj Pillai's camera and Ranjan Abraham's editing and was highly enthusiastic about Mohanlal's performance. Indiaglitz.com reviewer stated "The highlight of the story by Suresh Babu is that even if you may find the story a damn regular after the show, the narrative techniques used and the finesse in keeping the suspense element till the last 30 minutes, succeeds big time". And appreciated cinematography and Mohanlal's performance saying, "The movie remains a visual treat with Manoj Pillai working at his helm, panning over the landscapes and lush green forests with some real adventurous shots. The other highlight naturally remains Mohanlal.

Soundtrack

Accolades

References

External links
 
 Official website

2010s Malayalam-language films
Indian mystery thriller films
Films shot in Andhra Pradesh
Films scored by M. Jayachandran
Films shot in Telangana
Films shot in Kodaikanal
Films shot in Kerala
Films shot in Munnar
Films directed by M. Padmakumar